Laos is a country in Southeast Asia. Most people live in valleys of the Mekong River and its tributaries. Vientiane Prefecture, which includes Vientiane, the capital and largest city of the country, had about 569,000 residents in 1999. The country's population density is 23.4/km2.

In March 2005, the total population was 5.62 million (2.82 million females, 2.80 million males) in the 2005 census, an increase of 1.047 million since the previous 1995 census.

Overview 

The demographic makeup of the population is uncertain as the government divides the people into three groups according to the altitude at which they live, rather than according to ethnic origin. The lowland Lao (Lao Loum) account for 68%, upland Lao (Lao Theung) for 22%, and the highland Lao (Lao Soung, including the Hmong and the Yao) for 9%.

Ethnic Lao, the principal lowland inhabitants and politically and culturally dominant group, make up the bulk of the Lao Loum and around 60% of the total population. The Lao are a branch of the Tai people who began migrating southward from China in the first millennium A.D. In the north, there are mountain tribes of Miao–Yao, Austro-Asiatic, Tibeto-Burman Hmong, Yao, Akha, and Lahu who migrated into the region in the 19th century. Collectively, they are known as Lao Sung or highland Lao.

In the central and southern mountains, Mon–Khmer tribes known as Lao Theung or upland Lao, predominate. Some Chinese minorities remain, particularly in the towns, but many Laotian Chinese were forced to leave during 1975–80 when Laos followed the anti-Chinese policy of Vietnam.

The predominant religion is Theravada Buddhism. Animism is common among the mountain tribes. Buddhism and spirit worship coexist easily. There is a small number of Christians and Muslims.

The official and dominant language is Lao, a tonal language of the Tai linguistic group. Midslope and highland Lao speak tribal languages. French, once common in government and commerce, has declined in use, while knowledge of Englishthe language of the Association of Southeast Asian Nations (ASEAN)has increased in recent years.

With a median age of 19.3, Laos has the youngest population of Asia.

Population 
Until the year 2000 the proportion of children 0–14 years of age was over 40% of the total population. Due to decreasing fertility rates this proportion decreased to 34.5% in 2010. The proportion of elderly people is still very low (3.9%), although the proportion doubled between 1950 and 2010.

Structure of the population 
Structure of the population (March 2005; census):

Structure of the population (01.03.2015) (Census) :

Population estimates by sex and age group (01.VII.2020):

Vital statistics

UN estimates 

Births and deaths

Fertility and births 
Total fertility rate (TFR) and Crude birth rate (CBR):

Total fertility rate and other related statistics by province, as of 2011–2012:

Life expectancy 

Source: UN World Population Prospects

Ethnic groups 

Specialists are largely in agreement as to the ethnolinguistic classification of the ethnic groups of Laos. For the purposes of the 1995 census, the government of Laos recognised 149 ethnic groups within 47 main ethnicities. whereas the Lao Front for National Construction (LFNC) recently revised the list to include 49 ethnicities consisting of over 160 ethnic groups.

The term ethnic minorities is used by some to classify the non-Lao ethnic groups, while the term indigenous peoples is not used by the Lao PDR. These 160 ethnic groups speak a total of 82 distinct living languages.

Lao 53.2%, Khmu 11%, Hmong 9.2%, and other (over 100 minor ethnic groups) 26.6% (2015 census).

CIA World Factbook demographic statistics 

The following demographic statistics are from the CIA World Factbook, unless otherwise indicated.

Sex ratio:
at birth: 1.1 male(s)/female
under 15 years: 1.01 male(s)/female
15–64 years: 0.98 male(s)/female
65 years and over: 0.76 male(s)/female
total population: 0.98 male(s)/female (2009 est.)

Life expectancy at birth:
total population: 62.39 years (2011 est.)
male: 60.50 years (2011 est.)
female: 64.36 years (2011 est.)

Nationality:
noun: Lao(s) or Laotian(s)
adjective: Lao or Laotian

Religions:
Buddhist 67%, Christian 1.5%, other and unspecified 31.5% (see Religion in Laos)

Languages:
Lao (official), French, English, Vietnamese, and various ethnic languages

Literacy:
definition: age 15 and over can read and write
total population: 73%
male: 83%
female: 63% (2005 est.)

See also 
 List of ethnic groups in Laos

References

Sources 
 CIA World Factbook
 Lao Statistics Bureau

 

pt:Laos#Demografia